Love Me, Love My Mouse is a 1966 Tom and Jerry short produced by Chuck Jones and directed by him and Ben Washam.

Plot
Tom, in love with Toots, goes to her house, carrying Jerry in a ring box to woo her. Tom presents Jerry to his love interest, but Jerry pretends to be frightened of Tom and cuddles up with Toots, who instantly sympathizes with him, taking sides with the mouse.

Later, Jerry waves Tom and then aims to gain more sympathy from Toots by framing Tom to jumping into his mouth repeatedly in three times and Toots coming to Jerry's rescue. And later, Tom tells Toots that he wasn't even trying to eat Jerry but she refuses to listen to him and smashes the door with his hand before Jerry laughs with him, causing an angry Tom to grab Jerry and attempts to drop a concrete block on him and flatten him, but mad Toots interferes and causes Tom to drop the block on himself.

The next morning, Toots is putting baby powder on Jerry while a bandaged Tom hobbles to the table. Toots kisses Jerry, but while doing so, she soon finds that in addition to being quite adorable, Jerry is also quite tasty. She suddenly has a change of heart and decides to eat Jerry, now taking sides with Tom, who reacts with joy. Toots blows a kiss to Tom (as though to thank him for giving her Jerry, after all), and prepares to consume the mouse. But Jerry, now seeing that Toots is no longer on his side and deciding that pretending to be frightened of Tom was a bad idea, escapes to the door. The angry and hungry Toots chases Jerry down with a fork, a knife and a napkin tied around her neck while Tom limps out and slowly follows her.

Crew
Animation: Ben Washam, Philip Roman, Don Towsley & Dick Thompson
Layouts: Robert Givens
Backgrounds: Robert Inman
Vocal Effects: Mel Blanc, June Foray & William Hanna
Story: Michael Maltese
Music: Eugene Poddany
Design Consultant: Maurice Noble
Production Supervised by Les Goldman
Produced by Chuck Jones
Directed by Chuck Jones & Ben Washam

Production notes
The title is a pun on the phrase "Love me, love my dog". Love Me, Love My Mouse is the first short animated by Philip Roman and is one of the few times where Tom wins against Jerry.

External links

1966 animated films
1966 short films
1966 films
1960s animated short films
Tom and Jerry short films
Short films directed by Chuck Jones
Short films directed by Ben Washam
Films scored by Eugene Poddany
1960s American animated films
American animated short films
Animated films without speech
1966 comedy films
Metro-Goldwyn-Mayer short films
Metro-Goldwyn-Mayer animated short films
MGM Animation/Visual Arts short films
Films with screenplays by Michael Maltese